As a four letter acronym, NYSF can be:

 National Youth Science Forum, an Australian STEM outreach programme
 New York Shakespeare Festival, now known as Shakespeare in the Park, is a theatrical program in Central Park, New York City